Przemysław Radkiewicz (born 25 August 1970) is a Polish athlete. He competed in the men's high jump at the 1996 Summer Olympics.

References

1970 births
Living people
Athletes (track and field) at the 1996 Summer Olympics
Polish male high jumpers
Olympic athletes of Poland
Place of birth missing (living people)
Skra Warszawa athletes